Pandelirium is the fifth studio album by American rock band Legendary Shack Shakers.

Musical style 
The music on Pandelirium was described by AllMusic as a further departure from the Legendary Shack Shakers' established style than their previous album. The album's style has been classified as gothic rock, country, gypsy music, klezmer, rockabilly, blues, hardcore punk, hillbilly, hot jazz, industrial rock, polka, psychobilly, punk rock and Southern Gothic.

Reviews

Kyle Ryan's review for The A.V. Club rated the album "B−" and commented that the band "fire on all cylinders on Pandelirium's first half, particularly in the nihilistic "No Such Thing," but the carnival theme occasionally gets tiresome thereafter". Sepiachord summed up its review of the record with one word: "DAMN".

Track listing
"Ichabod!" – 3:15
"South Electric Eyes" – 2:46
"No Such Thing" – 3:34
"Iron Lung Oompah" – 3:10
"Bottom Road" – 2:07
"Somethin' in the Water" – 2:49
"Jipsy Valentine" – 3:29
"Thin the Herd" – 1:37
"Monkey on the Doghouse" – 2:01
"The Ballad of Speedy Atkins" – 2:19
"Bible, Candle and Skull" – 3:01
"Nellie Bell" – 2:42

Personnel
 J. D. Wilkes - vocals, harmonica, accordion, piano, toy piano, organ, glockenspiel, jaw harp 
 Mark Robertson - double bass, guitar, bass guitar, vocals, typewriter 
 David Lee - guitar, vocals

Additional personnel:
Jerry Roe - drums, percussion
Paulie Simmonz - drums
Cobra Joe - percussion
Steve Latanation - vocals, percussion
Rev. "Horton" Jim Heath - guitar
Jello Biafra - backing vocals
Jack Irwin - piano
Fats Kaplan - fiddle, banjo
Jim Hoke - baritone saxophone, bass clarinet
Bill Huber - tuba, trombone

References

2006 albums
Gothic country albums
Legendary Shack Shakers albums
Gothic rock albums by American artists